The Éditions Philippe Picquier are a publishing house created in 1986 and specialized in the publication of books coming from Far East, that is translated books which coming from China, Korea, Japan, Vietnam, India, Taiwan and Pakistan.

History 
Its creator, Philippe Picquier, founded his own publishing company despite not knowing any Asian language. He currently still serves as the company's CEO. He decided to venture into the publishing industry after a chance meeting: " publishing is like life, everything is question of meetings [...] and a real publishing house, that is that : a permanent meeting place. "
Choosing originally on Chinese literature and Japanese, he widened his literary horizon field in East Asia then, with the idea that "Asia is huge enough so that we take care only of it."

On the other hand, the house doesn’t stick to a specific domain, proposing at once literature, human sciences, essays, children's literature, comic strip, beautiful books..., because it is in question for the publisher “to create links between the genres ". It is addressed at a time to an adult public, and to a  younger public made up of teenagers and children.

The Éditions Philipe Picquier is distributed in France by Harmonia Mundi which sells especially their works in the sale agency Harmonia Mundi in Paris. They also have branches in Belgium, Switzerland, and Canada, and accordingly have some international presence.
Located in Arles, the company employs nine staff members and holds a financial asset of €9000.
The publisher shares his premises with his distributor Harmonia Mundi. Since 1993, following money troubles of the house, Harmonia Mundi holds 60% of the house parts, while leaving at the disposal of Philippe Picquier a part of its general services.
The magazine Livre Hebdo classified it in October in 122nd position in the ranking of two hundred first ones publishers of France. It shows that in around thirty years the house knew to grow on slowly and make it a name in the publishing world.

Catalog 

Philippe Picquier accepts all the genres if they are relative at Asia.
The house proposes from now on about 1210 titles in catalog, on account of 50 titles by year. The backlist contains more than 350 works in paperback.
Whether it is at the youth backlist, or at the adult backlist, the Éditions Philippe Picquier care a lot at its book covers. The iconographic search is made by one famous designer, Dominique Picquier, the sister of Philippe Picquier. Her book covers guarantee a catalog coherence, and give meaning to the editorial policy. The images are always relative at Asia, oscillating between modernity and antiquity. According to the works, book covers illustrate them of Japanese or Chinese embossements, of photos more recent putting in scene persons of Asian origin.

Adult Domain
Adult collections is based on a department dedicated to human sciences proposing works of theology, documentaries, historical, ethnological, dealing with the sociological news. They offer in particular studies of the life, of the behavior and of the civilization of these countries. In another domain, beautiful books are also present, to art books such as photography and painting at cookbooks. Among graphic arts, the house proposes from now on comic strips and manga.
Through the essays, the writers try to study literature, art, the Asian thought, and their history to offer to the reader the aesthetics of the thought, of the philosophy and of the Asian culture.
At the literature level, the house catalog offers to the reader a huge choice, novels (literary or popular), crime novels, historical novel ... The Éditions Philippe Picquier also developed a domain dedicated to eroticism, strongly illustrated and informed in a collection named " Du pavillon des corps curieux ". They also leave a beautiful part to tales, often relative to classics, as well as short story of all kinds: fantasy, eroticism, crime writing and ... poetry.
Through biographies and testimonies, they are all the strong personalities of writers who express themselves, going to certain countries like China at a certain shape of liberation of the censorship.

Youth Domain
In 2003, the Éditions Philippe Picquier creates a youth catalog named "Picquier Jeunesse". “Tales, poetry, illustrated book, childhood and teen narratives, at youngs to the teenagers, to laugh or think, to question or have fun, they also show the reader and culture vitality. Here is thus a new collection of books to pass through the borders to the children and to discover Asia with new eyes.”
So, the house enlarges it readership proposing illustrated books, novels and saga in several volumes for the olders.

It is a question for  the house of reach the most possible domains so as to give at the reader the best overview of Asian culture.

Authors 
The Éditions Philippe Picquier works with a whole series of diverse origins: Vietnamese, Thai, Chinese, Japanese like Edogawa Ranpo and Seichō Matsumoto, Indians, Koreans, Indonesians reflecting the Asian cultural diversity that the house tries to make known.

Publications 
Among the works published by Editions Philippe Picquier are Memoirs of a Geisha by Yuki Inoue, Memoirs of a Eunuch in the Forbidden City by Dan Shi, and Coin Locker Babies by Ryū Murakami. Each of these titles had editions of more than 40,000 copies.

Notes

References 
 Article sur les éditions Philippe Picquier
 Rencontre avec Philippe Picquier

External links 
 Le site officiel des éditions Philippe Picquier

Book publishing companies of France